Arizmendi is a Spanish surname. It is the castilianized form of the Basque surname Arismendi, formed from aritz (oak) + mendi (mountain). 

It may refer to:

People
 Ángel Javier Arizmendi, Spanish football player
 Baby Arizmendi, Mexican boxer
 Daniel Arizmendi López, Mexican kidnapper
 Helena Arizmendi, Argentine opera singer
 Juan Alejo de Arizmendi, Puerto Rican cleric
 José María Arizmendiarrieta, founder of the Mondragon cooperatives

Others
 Arizmendi Bakery, cooperatives in the San Francisco Bay Area, California

See also 
 Arismendi (disambiguation)

References